The Adventures of Pureza: Queen of the Riles  is a 2011 Filipino comedy film directed by Soxie H. Topacio and starring Melai Cantiveros as Pureza. The film was produced by Sine Screen and Star Cinema. The film a had limited release on July 13, 2011.

Plot
A poor girl, by the name of Pura who lives near the rails of the train experiences fun, adventure, and romance, in the greatest adventure of her life. Together with her friend, Ruben, they try to find a model, by the name of Daniella Fabella Dela Bamba. If they did not succeed, they will be killed by the evil Mother Baby/Mother Greedy, and the Tsinelas gang. In search, Pura meets a boy by the name of Gerald, and falls in love with him. However, Gerald does not return her feelings, because he is in love with Daniella who is pregnant. Pura finds her mother, Purisima, who currently is a nun in a cathedral. Her mother helps her escape Mother Baby's guards. Sooner, Pura also learns that her best friend, Ruben, is in love with her, and falls in love with him in the process. When Mother Baby is defeated, she and Ruben get married, in the Train Station.

Cast
Melai Cantiveros as Pura Buraot/Pureza Mayriles/Sor. Eyes
Jason Francisco as Ruben Padilla/Sor. Throat
Joem Bascon as Gerald Tanderson
Martin del Rosario as Ulam Buraot/ Ulysses Buraot
Bianca Manalo as Daniella Fabella de la Bamba
Gina Pareño as Mother Baby/Mother Greedy
Nico Antonio as Hipon
Bella Flores as Sr.Pepa Papparazzi
Bentong as mother baby's guard
Gerard Acao as mother baby's guard
Pokwang as Sr.Purisima
Bekimon as Zeppy

Reception
The film garnered P19,844,817 in its 4-week of showing. It was in direct competition against Harry Potter and the Deathly Hallows – Part 2, in the Philippine box office.

References

External links
 The Adventures of Pureza at the Internet Movie Database

2011 films
2010s Tagalog-language films
Star Cinema films
2011 comedy films
Philippine comedy films
2010s English-language films